Tony Eprile is a South African writer.

Early life
Tony Eprile was born in Johannesburg, South Africa in 1955 to Jewish parents. He emigrated with his parents to the United States between 1970 and 1972 and  lives in Vermont.

He has taught at Northwestern University, Williams College, Bennington College, Lesley University, and the Iowa Writers' Workshop.

Career
Eprile is the author of the 1989 book Temporary Sojourner and Other South African Stories, which was a New York Times Notable Book of the Year.

His 2004 book The Persistence of Memory won the Koret Jewish Book Award. The novel was also a New York Times Notable Book of the Year and was listed as a best book of 2004 by The Washington Post and the Los Angeles Times.

Publications

Short stories
 Temporary Sojourner and Other South African Stories (1989)

Novels
 The Persistence of Memory (2004)

References

South African writers
Year of birth missing (living people)
Living people
Iowa Writers' Workshop faculty
Place of birth missing (living people)